Serpin peptidase inhibitor, clade B (ovalbumin), member 10 is a protein that in humans is encoded by the SERPINB10 gene.

Function 

The superfamily of high molecular weight serine proteinase inhibitors (serpins) regulate a diverse set of intracellular and extracellular processes such as complement activation, fibrinolysis, coagulation, cellular differentiation, tumor suppression, apoptosis, and cell migration. Serpins are characterized by a well-conserved tertiary structure that consists of 3 beta sheets and 8 or 9 alpha helices. A critical portion of the molecule, the reactive center loop connects beta sheets A and C. Protease inhibitor-10 (PI10; SERPINB10) is a member of the ov-serpin subfamily, which, relative to the archetypal serpin PI1 (MIM 107400), is characterized by a high degree of homology to chicken ovalbumin, lack of N- and C-terminal extensions, absence of a signal peptide, and a serine rather than an asparagine residue at the penultimate position.

References

Further reading